Pearblossom  is an unincorporated community located in the Antelope Valley of the Mojave Desert, in northern Los Angeles County, California.

The town has a  population of 2,435. The ZIP Code is 93553 and the community is inside area code 661. According to the Greater Antelope Valley Economic Alliance report of 2009, the Palmdale / Lancaster urbanized area has a population of 483,998, of which Pearblossom is a part.

Geography

The name Pearblossom came from the multitude of local pear farms along the southern ridge of the Antelope Valley. A few still exist today, but most of those farms are now abandoned and have returned to the desert landscape or have been overridden by small-scale housing development.

Pearblossom is also a popular destination, for its annual Duck Races; convenient location for hiking in the foothills; and picturesque photo opportunities.

Pearblossom is well known by Southlanders as the site of one of the most dangerous roads in the US. State Route 138 (Pearblossom Highway) is the main street in Pearblossom and as of 2004 has been the location of numerous serious and fatal automobile accidents in its Palmdale to I-15 segment. Daily traffic on the recently expanded highway ranges from 25,000 to 30,000 vehicles, including many short & long haul freight trucks. Overuse of Pearblossom Highway is chiefly on Friday evenings, Saturdays and Sundays, the time period many use the route to travel to Las Vegas. This section of 138's route is commonly used as a bypass of the Los Angeles Metropolitan region, and as a route from the Antelope Valley to the Inland Empire. Highway 138 or Pearblossom Highway has been somewhat improved, now with three or four lanes along some segments, and some of the dips  taken out of the highway in many of the most dangerous areas.

Arts
Pearblossom (in name only at present) is found in the following creative works:

 The Crows of Pearblossom, authored by Aldous Huxley
  Aldous Huxley's home in the early 1940s was nearby in Llano and is now the filming location of Pearblossom Picture Ranch
 Pearblossom Highway, a photographic collage assembled by David Hockney
 The community is mentioned in I Love Dick, the 1997 novel by Chris Kraus

Pearblossom Highway (1986) was actually photographed in the Littlerock rural vicinity; it, like Huxley's The Crows of Pearblossom, is not about Pearblossom proper.

In 1997, Western actor Louis R. Faust died in his Pearblossom lodgings on Hwy 138. His son, Louis R. Faust, Jr., expired here in 2010.

Notable residents
 Sam Crawford 
 George Lazenby
 George Voskovec

References

External links
 Pearblossom Chamber of Commerce

Unincorporated communities in Los Angeles County, California
Antelope Valley
Populated places in the Mojave Desert
Unincorporated communities in California